16th National Board of Review Awards
December 23, 1944
The 16th National Board of Review Awards were announced on 23 December 1944.

Best English Language Films
None But the Lonely Heart
Going My Way
The Miracle of Morgan's Creek
Hail the Conquering Hero
The Song of Bernadette
Wilson
Meet Me in St. Louis
Thirty Seconds over Tokyo
Thunder Rock
Lifeboat

Winners
Best English Language Film: None But the Lonely Heart
Best Documentary: Memphis Belle: A Story of a Flying Fortress
Best Acting:
Ethel Barrymore - None But the Lonely Heart
Ingrid Bergman - Gaslight
Humphrey Bogart - To Have and Have Not
Eddie Bracken - Hail the Conquering Hero
Bing Crosby - Going My Way
June Duprez - None But the Lonely Heart
Betty Hutton - The Miracle of Morgan's Creek
Margaret O'Brien - Meet Me In St. Louis
Franklin Pangborn - Hail the Conquering Hero

Notes

External links
National Board of Review of Motion Pictures :: Awards for 1944

1944
1944 film awards
1944 in American cinema